Edward Grassman (November 16, 1882 – September 20, 1952) was a member of the Wisconsin State Assembly.

Biography
Grassman was born on November 16, 1882 in Richland County, Wisconsin. He graduated from high school in Sextonville, Wisconsin before attending the University of Wisconsin–Whitewater and Valparaiso University. Grassman died on September 20, 1952.

Career
Grassman was a member of the Assembly from 1933 until his death. Additionally, he was an alderman and Mayor of Edgerton, Wisconsin and Supervisor of Rock County, Wisconsin. He was a Republican.

References

People from Richland County, Wisconsin
People from Edgerton, Wisconsin
Republican Party members of the Wisconsin State Assembly
Mayors of places in Wisconsin
Wisconsin city council members
University of Wisconsin–Whitewater alumni
Valparaiso University alumni
1882 births
1952 deaths
20th-century American politicians